Esther Hernandez is a performance and installation artist based in Denver, Colorado.

References

Year of birth missing (living people)
Living people
Artists from Denver
21st-century American women artists
American performance artists
American installation artists